This is a list of active and extinct volcanoes in Yemen.

See also 
 Geography of Yemen
 Geology of Yemen
 Mountains in the Arabian Peninsula

References 

Yemen
 
Volcanoes